Kunaal Vermaa is an Indian lyricist and poet from Sri Madhopur, Sikar district, Rajasthan, India. His debut song as a lyricist was Hasi from the movie Hamari Adhuri Kahani composed by Ami Mishra.

Discography

Films songs

Singles

Awards and nominations

References

External links 

Indian male poets
Indian lyricists
People from Amethi
Living people
Year of birth missing (living people)